Limimaricola pyoseonensis is a Gram-negative, obligately halophilic, aerobic, heterotrophic, rod-shaped and motile bacterium from the genus of Limimaricola which has been isolated from sand from the beach from Pyoseon in Korea.

References 

Rhodobacteraceae
Bacteria described in 2010